People's rebellion may refer to:

The Hmong people's rebellion led by Zhong Xang Yajiaumo
The Qiang people's rebellion, a reaction to reforms and policies during the Han Dynasty
A description of war in the novel "Notes from Underground" by Fyodor Dostoyevsky